Dorothy Dale Elizabeth McClements (born December 31, 1944 in Winnipeg, Manitoba, Canada) was an American gymnast. She competed for the United States at the 1964 Summer Olympics in Tokyo.

References

1944 births
Living people
American female artistic gymnasts
American people of Canadian descent
Canadian female artistic gymnasts
Sportspeople from Winnipeg
Gymnasts at the 1964 Summer Olympics
Olympic gymnasts of the United States
Pan American Games medalists in gymnastics
Pan American Games gold medalists for the United States
Pan American Games silver medalists for the United States
Gymnasts at the 1963 Pan American Games
21st-century American women